Hometown is the second studio album from Ten Second Epic. It was released January 27, 2009 on Black Box Recordings. It was made available for full streaming on their MySpace page on January 23. The first single, "Life Times", was released on November 10, 2008 on YouTube and later on television. The second single was "Welcome to Wherever You Are" and was released on March 30, along with a music video. The third single is "Every Day" that debuted with a video.

Track listing

References

2009 albums
Ten Second Epic albums
Albums produced by Garth Richardson